The following lists events that happened during 1953 in Cambodia.

Incumbents
 Monarch: Norodom Sihanouk
 Prime Minister: Penn Nouth (until November 22), Chan Nak (starting November 22)

Events

May
 May 9 - France agrees to the provisional independence of Cambodia with King Norodom Sihanouk.

November
 November 9 - The Khmer Issarak begins to fight the French Army and Cambodia joins the First Indochina War but the Kingdom of Cambodia is established.

References

 
1950s in Cambodia
Years of the 20th century in Cambodia
Cambodia
Cambodia